Furry Legends is a video game franchise developed by Gamelion Studios available on WiiWare and on alternative mobile platforms. The game was released in North America on July 19, 2010, and in PAL regions on August 20, 2010. The game costs 1000 Wii Points.

Gameplay

Players can control Leilas' Furballs by using the Wii Remote and Nunchuk. Using the analogue stick on the Nunchuk makes Furballs rolling to the left and right and control their flight a bit. The A button makes character jumping. Pressing Z button, choosing direction and shaking the Wii Remote allows to attack Sqauries and other objects. Every Furball has the unique abilities that can be released by B button when the character's level of FurPower is high enough.

Development

The development process was revealed by the team in many interviews done by websites interested in the gaming industry.

Other platforms
The game has been published by SkyZone Entertainment in Verizon Wireless network for BREW and Android platforms  and on Android Market. Furry Legends for Samsung Bada was officially announced on February 15, 2010 at the Mobile World Congress in Barcelona. The game is based on the 3D version of Furry Legends and scheduled for launch in 2010.
All platforms:
Androit 
Appel 
Dsiware
Wiiware

Reception

While initial previews were somewhat positive, overall reception for the title was mixed. Currently on Metacritic, Furry Legends holds a score of 61% citing mixed or average reviews. IGN awarded the game a score of 6 out of 10, criticising the length, physics and game-play. Similarly, Cheat Code Central awarded the game a score of 2 out of 5, noting that the game was more frustrating than fun, and stating that "[While] there are some chestnuts to be found, they lay buried beneath a mass of platforming desecration."

External links
Furry Legends website - official franchise website
nintendo.com - Furry Legends  - Nintendo of America game page

References

2010 video games
DSiWare games
Fantasy video games
Platform games
Side-scrolling video games
Video games developed in Finland
Video games with 2.5D graphics
WiiWare games
Android (operating system) games